Pornpimol Kunbang (born ) is a Thai indoor volleyball player. She is a member of the Thailand women's national volleyball team.

She participated in the 2012 FIVB Volleyball World Grand Prix.

References

External links
 Profile at FIVB.org

1993 births
Living people
Pornpimol Kunbang
Place of birth missing (living people)
Pornpimol Kunbang